Llanyre is a village and electoral ward in Radnorshire, Powys, Wales.  The community had a population of 1,061 in 2001, increasing to 1,141 at the 2011 Census.
It includes the village of Newbridge-on-Wye.

Location
Llanyre is to the west of Llandrindod Wells, in the upper Wye Valley.  The area is largely rural, and is probably best known for its fishing and walking opportunities - with easy access to the Elan Valley and Brecon Beacons.

Architecture
Housing in Llanyre comprises an eclectic mix of nineteenth century stone and brick housing, with newer, more modern housing schemes currently under development.

Administration
Llanyre was a county electoral ward (until 2022) and remains a community ward to the community council. The electorate of Llanyre ward was 940 in 2005.  Local administration is undertaken by the Llanyre Community Council.  This is divided into three community wards, consisting of 12 elected members, as such:
 Llanfihangel Helygen - 2 members, 44 electors.
 Llanyre Rural - 5 members, 400 electors.
 Llanyre Village - 5 members, 496 electors.
Meetings are held every third Tuesday in the month, excluding August.

Following a boundary review, the Llanyre county ward was substantially added to, with 3 neighbouring communities being added. It was renamed Llanyre and Nantmel as a consequence. The changes were effective from the 2022 local elections.

Church of St Llyr

The Church of St Llyr lies to the south of the village, on the west of the A4081 road to Rhayader.  Rebuilt entirely from 1885 to 1887, little remains of the original church apart from the very front of the building. The churchyard contains one war grave, of a Royal Flying Corps officer of World War I.

It is a grade II* listed building.

Nearby attractions
Llandrindod Golf Course "(3 miles)"
Gilfach Nature Reserve (8 Miles)

References

External links
Llanyre Community Council Homepage
 Church of St Lyr

Villages in Powys
Wards of Powys